Augustus Bailey (February 18, 1951 – November 28, 1988) was an American basketball player. He played college basketball for UTEP. Bailey played for the Houston Rockets, New Orleans Jazz, and Washington Bullets in the NBA.

Born in Gibson, North Carolina, Bailey played collegiately for the University of Texas at El Paso.

He was selected by the Houston Rockets in the 2nd round (23rd pick overall) of the 1974 NBA draft and by the San Diego Conquistadors in the second round of the 1974 ABA Draft.

He played for the Rockets (1974–76), New Orleans Jazz (1976–79) and Washington Bullets (1979–80) in the NBA for 147 games.

Bailey was found dead in his New Orleans apartment on November 28, 1988, with multiple stab wounds. According to police, he had gotten into a heated argument with a woman who lived with him and she stabbed him repeatedly in the chest.

References

External links

1951 births
1988 deaths
1988 murders in the United States
American men's basketball players
Basketball players from North Carolina
Deaths by stabbing in the United States
Houston Rockets draft picks
Houston Rockets players
New Orleans Jazz players
People from Scotland County, North Carolina
People murdered in Louisiana
San Diego Conquistadors draft picks
Shooting guards
Small forwards
UTEP Miners men's basketball players
Washington Bullets players